Dharikshan Mishr (1901-1997) was a Bhojpuri poet and Writer. He was honored with the Bhasa Samman Award in 1996 for his contribution to Bhojpuri literature.

Life 

He was born in 1901 at Bariyarpur village in Kushinagar in the North-Western Provinces of British India.

Works 

 Gandhi Gaan
 Gandhi Garima
 Shivji ke Kheti

References 

1901 births
1997 deaths
Indian writers
Indian poets